Reed Jones (June 30, 1953 in Portland, Oregon – June 19, 1989 in Sherman Oaks, California) was a dancer and choreographer whose credits included Skimbleshanks in the original cast of CATS and Big Deal in the Jerome Robbins revival of West Side Story. Originally cast as an understudy, Reed originated the role of Skimbleshanks: The Railway Cat in the original Broadway company of "Cats". He replaced originally cast Willie Rosario in the pre-opening rehearsal period after Rosario suffered a prolonged knee injury.

Performances
A Funny Thing Happened on the Way to the Forum  [US Tour]
National Tour, 1987
Protean

Jubilee 
Off-Off-Broadway Concert, 1986
Performer

As Is
Original Broadway Production, 1985
Chet (Standby)
Clone (Standby)
Saul (Standby)

The Loves of Anatol [Broadway]
1985
The Young Gentleman (dancer)
Franz

You Can't Take It With You
[Broadway, 1983]
Choreographer (Musical Staging)

Cats 
Original Broadway Production, 1982
Skimbleshanks

Play Me a Country Song [Broadway]
Unknown, 1982
Norm
Dance Captain

America [Broadway]
Radio City Music Hall, 1981
Principal

West Side Story 
Broadway Revival, 1980
Big Deal (A Jet)
Action (Understudy)
Gladhand (Understudy)

Peter Pan 
Broadway Revival, 1979
Indian
Kangaroo
Dance Captain

Death
He died due to AIDS related illness on June 19, 1989, eleven days before his thirty-sixth birthday.

1953 births
1989 deaths
American male dancers
American choreographers
Artists from Portland, Oregon
20th-century American dancers
AIDS-related deaths in California